NGC 4633 is a spiral galaxy located about 70 million light-years away in the constellation of Coma Berenices. It is interacting with the nearby galaxy NGC 4634. NGC 4633 was discovered by astronomer Edward D. Swift on April 27, 1887. It was rediscovered on November 23, 1900 by astronomer Arnold Schwassmann and was later listed as IC 3688. NGC 4633 is a member of the  Virgo Cluster.

See also 
 List of NGC objects (4001–5000)
 Arp 116

References

External links

Spiral galaxies
Interacting galaxies
Coma Berenices
4633
IC objects
42699
7874
Astronomical objects discovered in 1887
Virgo Cluster
Discoveries by Edward Swift